Dodul (known as Master Dodul) is a Bangladeshi film actor. He won Bangladesh National Film Award for Best Child Artist for the film Lakhe Ekta (1990).

Selected films
 Lakhe Ekta - 1990
 Shilpi - 1995
 Hangor Nodi Grenade - 1997

Awards and nominations
National Film Awards

References

External links

Bangladeshi film actors
Best Child Artist National Film Award (Bangladesh) winners
Living people
Year of birth missing (living people)